Mason Spur is an elevated spur, partially ice-covered and over  high, which projects eastward from Mount Morning in Victoria Land, Antarctica. It was named by the Advisory Committee on Antarctic Names in 1963 for Robert Mason, a United States Antarctic Research Program representative at McMurdo Station in 1962–63.

Snow Petrel Peak marks the easternmost summit of Mason Spur.

References

Ridges of the Ross Dependency
Hillary Coast